Fereydoon Shahbazian (born 11 June 1942) is an Iranian performing musician, composer and conductor. He is the former conductor of the National Orchestra of Iran.

Biography 
Fereydoun Shahbazian was born on 11 June 1942 in Fakhr Razi Street, University of Tehran. His father, Hossein Shahbazian, was a well-known violinist. With the encouragement and guidance of his father, Fereydoon turned to music and studied music at the Higher Conservatory of Music and learned to play the violin. His first violin teacher was Ataollah Khadem Misagh, who soon introduced him to his Russian teacher, Serge Khutsif.

He studied with Khutsif until the end of elementary school. After that, he continued to study the violin until obtaining a diploma in playing this instrument, in the night classes of "Luigi Pasanari", which at that time was the concertmaster of the Tehran Symphony Orchestra. At the age of 17, he became a member of the Tehran Symphony Orchestra led by Heshmat Sanjari, after which he began his collaboration with the Radio Flower Orchestra. At that time, the Golha Orchestra was led by Ruhollah Khaleghi, followed by Javad Maroufi. In 1966, he became the leader of the radio choir and symphony orchestra.

He is a graduate of the Faculty of Fine Arts, University of Tehran. Shahbazian also began composing for the film in the 1980s.Together with Ali Moallem Damghani, he formed the Music Council of the Radio and television, which was responsible for overseeing and supporting pop music. He is currently retired from the Radio and Television and is one of the critics of Iranian pop music.

From September 2016 to March 2019, Fereydoon Shahbazian was the conductor of the National Orchestra of Iran. After resigning from the artistic management and permanent leadership of the National Orchestra of Iran, Shahbazian was appointed as the music consultant of the Roudaki Foundation, who resigned from this position on 21 May 2019.

Fereydoon Shahbazian started his career in cinema and starred in "Aghaye Hirglif" directed by Gholamali Erfan in 1980. He has composed pieces and music for many movies and TV series.

The commemoration ceremony of Fereydoon Shahbazian was held on 9 June 2019 at Niavaran Cultural Center.

Composing for Movies and Series 
Some of the soundtracks made by Fereydoun Shahbazian are:

 Dusters,Director: Davood Roustaei
 Long trips of Hami and Kami in the homeland, Director: Nader Ebrahimi
 The coin (Short), Director: Nemat Haghighi
 Horse, Director: Masoud Kimiai
 Said all three of them, Director: Gholamali Erfan
 Mr. Hieroglyph, Director: Gholamali Erfan
 Towards Simorgh, (documentary) Director: Hamid Soheyli
 DadShah, Director: Habib Kavosh
 Mirza Kuchak Khan, Director: Amir Ghavidel
 Who has Traveled, Director: Ahmad Nik Azar
 Autumn, Director: Rasoul Sadrameli

 Najaf Daryabandari: A Window on the World (Documentary short), Director: Bahman Maghsoudlou

 The Time I Came Back, Director: Vahid Mousaian
 Sufferance and Ecstasy, Director: Jahangir Almasi
 Golchehreh, Director: Vahid Mousaian
 Mahfel-e X, Director: Habib Kavosh
 Earring, Director: Vahid Mousaian
 Deportees, Director: Masoud Dehnamaki
 Khaneye roshan, Director: Vahid Mousaian
 Silence of the Sea, Director: Vahid Mousaian
 Aye zohaye zamin, Director: Vahid Mousaian
 The Last Supper, Director: Fereydoun Jeyrani
 Roomeshkan, Director: Naser Gholamrezai
 Agha-ye raees-jomhoor, Director: Abholghassem Talebi
 Heeva, Director: Rasool Mollagholi Poor
 Namzadi, Director: Naser Gholamrezai
 Yek mard, yek khers, Director: Masoud Jafari Jozani
 Se mard-e aami, Director: Siamak Taghipour
 Eye of the Hurricane, Director: Masoud Jafari Jozani
 Salha-ye khakestar, Director: Mehdi Sabbaghzadeh
 Vakil-e avval, Director: Jamshid Heydari
 Autumn, Director: Rasoul Sadrameli
 Shiler Valley Saga, Director: Ahmad Hasani Moghadam
 The Stone Lion, Director: Masoud Jafari Jozani
 Aavaar, Director: Sirus Alvand
 Silken Chains, Director: Hasan Karbakhsh

Awards 

 Forough Farrokhzad Award for Best Composer
 Nominated for Best Composer at the Fajr Film Festival for The Stone Lion, 1986
 Nominated for Best Composer at Fajr Film Festival for First Lawyer, 1987
 Nominated as the best composer at the Fajr Film Festival for the film in the Way of the Storm, 1988
 Honorary diploma for the best composer from the 15th Fajr Film Festival for nomination, 1996
 Statue of the best composer from the first period of the Cinema House celebration for the nomination film, 1997
 Nominated for Best Composer at the Third Cinema House Festival for Hiva, 1999
 Nominated for Best Composer at the Fajr Film Festival for My Wishes, 2001
 Nominated for Best Composer at the 6th Cinema House Festival for My Wishes, 2002
 Statue of the best composer from the 48th Asia-Pacific Film Festival for the film Extinction of the Sea, 2004
 Nominated for Best Composer at the Cinema House Festival for Golchehreh, 2011
 Nominated for Best Composer at Fajr Film Festival for Fourth child, 2012
 Nominated for Best Composer at the Cinema House Festival for The Fourth Child, 2014

References

External links 

Iranian conductors (music)
Iranian composers
Iranian violinists
Living people
1942 births
21st-century conductors (music)
21st-century violinists